Morum roseum is a species of sea snail, a marine gastropod mollusk in the family Harpidae, the harp snails.

Description
The length of the shell attains 21.5 mm.

Distribution
This marine species occurs off the Marquesas Islands.

References

 Bouchet P. 2002. Protoconchs, dispersal, and tectonic plates biogeography: new pacific species of Morum (Gastropoda: Harpidae). Journal of Conchology 37(5): 533-549

Harpidae